Yehuda Vilner is a former Israeli footballer.

He is the father of Shlomi and Liron Vilner.

Honours
Israeli Second Division (1):
1977-78

References

1951 births
Living people
Israeli Jews
Israeli footballers
Hapoel Netanya F.C. players
Bnei Yehuda Tel Aviv F.C. players
Maccabi Netanya F.C. players
Hapoel Ramat Gan F.C. players
Liga Leumit players
Footballers from Netanya
Association football forwards